Sergei Sergeyevich Ostapenko (born 23 February 1986) is a former Kazakh footballer, whose last team was FC Astana.

Career
In 2003, Ostapenko had graduated from FC Almaty (FC Tsesna at that time) football academy and had been starting in the first team since then, before his transfer to FC Tobol in 2007. That was definitely an upward move in his career. He helped the team to win the Intertoto Cup that season, to finish second in the Super League and win the Kazakhstan Cup.

Royal Antwerp
On 31 January 2008, along with Maksim Zhalmagambetov, Ostapenko signed a two-year contract with Royal Antwerp FC. The Belgian team's manager noted that the duo's youth, international experience and physical characteristics were key motivations for signing the pair. However, Ostapenko's European adventure was not particularly successful and he did not start a single game for the reds, only playing in the reserve team. Both Ostapenko and Maksim Zhalmagambetov shortly returned to Kazakhstan in the middle of the Kazakhstan Premier League 2008.

In July 2014, Ostapenko moved from FC Astana to FC Kaisar, returning to Astana in April 2015 after his Kaisar contract had expired.

International career
At the age of 21, Sergei earned his first cap on 6 June 2007 in Euro 2008 qualifier against Azerbaijan. He scored his first goal for the national team against Armenia, which also was a lone winning goal. Since then however, he has scored 3 more goals, all in World Cup Qualifiers, including 2 at home to Andorra.

Career Stats

Club
Last update: 21 September 2014

International goals

Honours
 Kazakhstan League Runner-up: 2007
 Kazakhstan Cup Winner: 2006, 2007, 2010
 Intertoto Cup Winner: 2007

References

External links
Profile at KFF website

Living people
1986 births
Kazakhstani footballers
Association football forwards
Royal Antwerp F.C. players
Kazakhstan international footballers
Kazakhstani expatriate footballers
Expatriate footballers in Belgium
FC Aktobe players
FC Tobol players
FC Astana players
FC Kaisar players
FC Zhetysu players
Kazakhstan Premier League players
Challenger Pro League players